Organogermanium chemistry is the chemical science of organogermanium compounds, which are organometallic compounds containing a carbon to germanium chemical bond. Germanium shares group 14 in the periodic table with silicon, tin and lead, and not surprisingly the chemistry of organogermanium is in between that of organosilicon compounds and organotin compounds.

One reason that limited synthetic value of organogermanium compound is costs of germanium compounds. On the other hand, germanium is advocated as a non-toxic alternative to many toxic organotin reagents.  Compounds like tetramethylgermanium and tetraethylgermanium are used in the microelectronics industry as precursors for germanium dioxide chemical vapor deposition.

The first organogermanium compound, tetraethylgermane, was synthesised by Winkler in 1887, by the reaction of germanium tetrachloride with diethylzinc. The organogermanium compound bis (2-Carboxyethylgermanium)sesquioxide was first reported in 1966.

Organogermanes
Organogermanes of the type R4Ge with alkyl (R) groups are accessed through the cheapest available germanium precursor germanium tetrachloride and alkyl nucleophiles. The following trends are observed going down the carbon group: The nucleophilicity increases Si<Ge<Sn as well as the hyperconjugation effect known as the beta-silicon effect Si<Ge<<Sn. The Si-C bond is mainly covalent and the Sn-C relatively polar, bonds with germanium are in between.

Just as with silicon the nucleophilicity of allyl germanes is high due to the intrinsic polarization of the bond (difference in electronegativity 2.55 − 2.01 = 0.54) and the combined stabilizing effect on the α-carbonion by the allyl group and the germanium atom. The germanium pendant of the Sakurai reaction was discovered in 1986:

The carbonyl group in this reaction is activated with boron trifluoride.

Hydrides
Isobutylgermane (IBGe) (Me2CHCH2)GeH3 is the organogermanium hydride that is a high vapor pressure liquid germanium source for MOVPE. Isobutylgermane is currently investigated as safer and less hazardous alternative to toxic germane gas in microelectronic applications.

Tris(trimethylsilyl)germanium hydride (Me3Si)3GeH has been investigated as a non-toxic alternative to many tin hydrides such as tributyltinhydride.

Other compounds

Triphenylgermanol (Ph3GeOH) is known, existing as colorless solid.  Like the isostructural silanol, it engages in hydrogen bonding in the solid-state.

Many germanium reactive intermediates are known: germylenes (carbene pendants), germyl free radicals, germynes (carbyne pendants). Digermynnes only exist for extremely bulky substituents.  Unlike alkynes, the C-Ge-Ge-C core of these Digermynnes is nonlinear, although they are planar.  The Ge-Ge distance is 2.22 Å, and the Ge-Ge-C angles are 131°. Such compounds are prepared by the reduction of bulky arylgermanium(II) halides.

As with silicon and contrasting with carbon, compounds containing Ge=C (germenes) and Ge=Ge (digermylenes) double bonds are rare.  One example is the bulky derivatives of  germabenzene, an analogue of benzene.

External links 
 Tetramethylgermanium Datasheet commercial supplier
 Tetraethylgermanium Datasheet commercial supplier
 Tris(trimethylsilyl)germanium hydride Datasheet commercial supplier

References